This list of Savannah State University alumni includes graduates, non-graduate former students and current students of Georgia State Industrial College for Colored Youth, Georgia State College, Savannah State College, and/or Savannah State University. Notable administration, faculty, and staff are found on the list of Savannah State University faculty.

Savannah State University is a four-year, state-supported, historically black university (HBCU) located in Savannah, Georgia. The first baccalaureate degree was awarded in 1898. In 1928 the college became a full four-year degree-granting institution and removed the high school and normal school programs. In 1932 the school became a full member institution of the University System of Georgia.

Academics

Business

Politics and public service

U.S. Military services

Journalist and news media personalities

Athletics

See also
Savannah State University alumni

References